In baseball, the battery is the pitcher and the catcher, who may also be called batterymen, or batterymates in relation to one another.

History

Origins of the term
The use of the word 'battery' in baseball was first coined by Henry Chadwick in the 1860s in reference to the firepower of a team's pitching staff and inspired by the artillery batteries then in use in the American Civil War. Later, the term evolved to indicate the combined effectiveness of pitcher and catcher.

Pitching to a preferred batterymate
Throughout the history of baseball, although teams have typically carried multiple catchers, star pitchers have often preferred the familiarity of working consistently with a single batterymate.

In the early 20th century, some prominent pitchers were known to have picked their favorite catchers. Sportswriter Fred Lieb recalls the batteries of Christy Mathewson / Frank Bowerman beginning in 1899 with the New York Giants, Jack Coombs / Jack Lapp beginning in 1908 with the Philadelphia Athletics, Cy Young / Lou Criger gaining the greatest attention in 1901 with the Boston Americans (later the Red Sox), and Grover Cleveland Alexander / Bill Killefer beginning in 1911 with the Philadelphia Phillies. Other successful batteries were Ed Walsh / Billy Sullivan beginning in 1904, along with Walter Johnson / Muddy Ruel and Dazzy Vance / Hank DeBerry both starting in 1923.

In 1976, several major league pitchers chose their preferred catchers; a notion that had fallen out of practice for some decades. For instance, catcher Bob Boone of the Philadelphia Phillies, though one of the best catchers of his day, was replaced with Tim McCarver at the request of pitcher Steve Carlton. The Carlton/McCarver combination worked well in 32 out of Carlton's 35 games that season, plus one playoff game. The two had previously been batterymates for four years (1966–69) with the St. Louis Cardinals. Another battery-by-choice was superstitious rookie pitcher Mark Fidrych who was new to the Detroit Tigers in 1976, insisting on rookie catcher Bruce Kimm behind the plate. The Fidrych/Kimm combination started all 29 of Fidrych's 1976 season games. The two continued as a battery through 1977.

Knuckleballers have often preferred pitching to "personal" batterymates due to the difficulty of catching the unusual pitch. One notable example was Boston Red Sox pitcher Tim Wakefield and his preferred catcher, Doug Mirabelli.

Most starts

The below table shows battery-mates that  have appeared in more than 200 starts together since 1914. Boldface indicates active teammates.

Especially notable are the five Hall of Fame batteries below, including Lefty Grove (ranked by Bill James as the second-greatest pitcher of all time) and Mickey Cochrane (ranked by James as the eighth-greatest catcher) of the 1925–1933 Philadelphia Athletics, and Yogi Berra and Whitey Ford, who appeared in multiple World Series together for the New York Yankees between 1950 and 1963.

Most no-hitters

The table below lists the battery combinations that share the record for most major league no-hitters (2).

(*) Catchers Silver Flint and King Kelly shared catching duties for Corcoran's August 19, 1880 no-hitter.

Sibling batteries
The following chart of major league sibling batteries lists pitcher/catcher siblings who played on the same major league team during a single major league season. The pair may or may not have performed as a battery in an actual major league game.

Unique among those listed below are Mort and Walker Cooper, who formed the National League's starting battery at both the 1942 and 1943 Major League Baseball All-Star Games, and also appeared as a battery in the 1942, 1943, and 1944 World Series, the only sibling battery to achieve either feat.

Other records and firsts

Most games
The battery that appeared in the most games together was Mariano Rivera and Jorge Posada, with 598 games together for the New York Yankees between 1995 and 2011.

Most wins
The most games by a starting battery that were won by its team was set at 203 by Adam Wainwright and Yadier Molina on May 15, 2022, surpassing the previous record of 202 which had been set by Warren Spahn and Del Crandall. Currently, the record is 213 wins.

Most innings
Red Faber and Ray Schalk, who played together for the Chicago White Sox between 1914 and 1928, recorded the most total innings as a battery (2553.2).

Single-game records
Madison Bumgarner and Buster Posey of the San Francisco Giants became the major league's first battery to hit grand slams in the same game when they accomplished the feat on July 13, 2014 against the Arizona Diamondbacks. The home run was pitcher Bumgarner's second grand slam of the season (April 11).

First Black battery
Pitcher George Stovey and catcher Moses Fleetwood Walker formed the first Black battery in professional baseball history when they teamed up for the 1887 Newark Little Giants of the International Association. The tandem recorded ten consecutive wins to begin the season before the Chicago White Stockings refused to take the field on July 15, leading to the league's implementation of the color line.

Father-son batteries
Frank Duncan, Jr. and his son, Frank Duncan III, of the 1941 Kansas City Monarchs are thought to be the only father-son battery in major league history.

In 2012, former major leaguer Roger Clemens came out of retirement to pitch for the minor league Sugar Land Skeeters of the Atlantic League of Professional Baseball, and formed a battery with his son Koby Clemens in a game on September 7.

See also

Glossary of baseball

References

Further reading
  Batteries with 3,000 or more outs (1893–2017).

Baseball positions